The Pen-Pictures of Modern Africans and African Celebrities is a prosopography or collective biography of prominent (Euro-)African families on what was then the British Gold Coast, written by the prominent Gold Coast African Charles Francis Hutchison around 1929. The document remains an important source for scientific research on the history of the colony, and was for this purpose republished in an annotated scholarly edition by Michel Doortmont of the University of Groningen in 2004.

Notes

References
 

1929 non-fiction books
Gold Coast (British colony)
History of Ghana